Amdanga is a village and a gram panchayat in the Amdanga CD block in the Barasat Sadar subdivision of the North 24 Parganas district in the state of West Bengal, India.

Geography

Location

Area overview
The area covered in the map alongside is largely a part of the north Bidyadhari Plain. located in the lower Ganges Delta. The country is flat. It is a little raised above flood level and the highest ground borders the river channels. 54.67% of the people of the densely populated area lives in the urban areas and 45.33% lives in the rural  areas.

Note: The map alongside presents some of the notable locations in the subdivision. All places marked in the map are linked in the larger full screen map.

Civic administration

Police station
Amdanga police station covers an area of 138.8 km2 and serves a total population of 139,328. It has jurisdiction over Amdanga CD Block.

CD block HQ
The headquarters of Amdanga CD block are located at Amdanga village.

Demographics
According to the 2011 Census of India, Amdanga had a total population of 3,855, of which 1,989 (52%) were males and 1,866 (48%) were females. Population in the age range 0–6 years was 430. The total number of literate persons in Amdanga was 2,720 (79.42% of the population over 6 years).

Transport
National Highway 12 (old numbering NH 34) passes through Amdanga.

Healthcare
Amdanga Rural Hospital with 30 beds functions as the main medical facility in Amdanga CD block. There are primary health centres at Adhata (Adhata-Joypur PHC  with 6 beds), Masunda (Marich PHC with 10 beds) and Baraberia PHC (with 6 beds).

See also
  Map of Amdanga CD Block on Page 339 of District Census Handbook.

References

Villages in North 24 Parganas district